Industriales Naucalpan Futbol Club, commonly referred to as Industriales Naucalpan is a Mexican professional football based in Naucalpan. The club currently plays on the Liga de Balompié Mexicano.

History
Industriales Naucalpan was established on 27 March 2020 as one of the founding members of the Liga de Balompié Mexicano. The club is owned and operated by a group of local businessmen from Naucalpan.

On 21 July 2020 the club presented Ricardo Carbajal as manager of the club.

Industriales has long-term plans which include fielding a women's football team and building a sports hospital and their own stadium in Naucalpan.

Stadium
The club initially announced that it would be playing their home games at the Estadio José Ortega Martínez, which has a capacity of 3,700 seated spectators and it is property of the Universidad del Valle de México. Nevertheless, in July 2020, it was stated that negotiations between the university and the club did not succeed because American football team Raptors Naucalpan, also playing at the José Ortega Martínez stadium, refused to share the stadium with the Industriales. The team later reached an agreement with the Raptors and returned to the originally planned stadium.

Players

First-team squad

Personnel

Coaching staff

Management

References

Association football clubs established in 2020
2020 establishments in Mexico
Sport in Naucalpan
Sports teams in the State of Mexico
Liga de Balompié Mexicano Teams